Meet the Santas is an American television film starring Steve Guttenberg and Crystal Bernard. It premiered on Hallmark Channel in 2005.  It is a sequel to 2004's Single Santa Seeks Mrs. Claus. As of 2010, it is shown in the 25 Days of Christmas programming block on ABC Family.

Plot
Nicholas Claus (Steve Guttenberg) and Beth Sawtelle (Crystal Bernard) get ready to marry on Christmas Eve.

Cast
 Steve Guttenberg as Nicholas Claus 
 Crystal Bernard as Elizabeth "Beth" Sawtelle
 Dominic Scott Kay as Jake Sawtelle 
 Armin Shimerman as Ernest
 Mariette Hartley as Joanna Hardcastle
 Parker McKenna Posey as Poppy Frost

See also
 List of Christmas films
 Santa Claus in film

External links
 

2005 television films
2005 films
American Christmas films
Hallmark Channel original films
Christmas television films
American sequel films
Films scored by Mark Watters
Santa Claus in film